Chunghwa station is a passenger railway station in Chunghwa-ŭp, Chunghwa County, a suburban county of P'yŏngyang, North Korea. It is on the P'yŏngbu Line, which was formed from part of the Kyŏngŭi Line to accommodate the shift of the capital from Seoul to P'yŏngyang. Though this line physically connects P'yŏngyang to Pusan via Torasan, in operational reality it ends at Kaesŏng due to the Korean Demilitarized Zone.

References

Railway stations in North Korea
Buildings and structures in North Hwanghae Province
Railway stations opened in 1906
1906 establishments in Korea